K. V. Varadaraj (7 May 1924 – 20 December 2011) was an Indian footballer. He competed for India at the 1948 Summer Olympics.

Honours

India
Asian Games Gold medal: 1951
Colombo Cup: 1953

See also
 Football at the 1948 Summer Olympics

References

External links
 

1924 births
2011 deaths
Indian footballers
India international footballers
Olympic footballers of India
Footballers at the 1948 Summer Olympics
Sportspeople from Mysore
Footballers from Bangalore
Association football goalkeepers
Footballers at the 1951 Asian Games
Medalists at the 1951 Asian Games
Asian Games gold medalists for India
Asian Games medalists in football